Roger Stedman was  Archdeacon of Armagh from 1414 to 1426: he is also recorded as a Prebendary of Tipperkevin at St Patrick's Cathedral, Dublin in 1438

Notes

Archdeacons of Armagh
15th-century Irish Roman Catholic priests